Lieutenant General Sir Francis Poitiers Nosworthy KCB DSO MC (21 September 1887 – 9 July 1971) was a British Army officer who became Commander-in-Chief of West Africa Command during World War II.

Military career
Educated at Exeter School and the Royal Military Academy, Woolwich, Nosworthy was commissioned into the Royal Engineers in 1907. He took part in the Abor and Mishmi expedition to India in 1912 and served in World War I as a General Staff Officer in France. After taking part in the Third Anglo-Afghan War in 1919, he attended the Staff College, Quetta from 1919 to 1920, and was appointed second-in-command (2IC) of the Sudan Defence Force in 1926, followed by attendance at the Imperial Defence College in 1931, he commanded the 5th Infantry Brigade at Aldershot Command in 1935 and Deputy Chief of the General Staff at Army Headquarters in India in 1938.

He served in World War II as Commander of IV Corps from 1940: after the Norwegian Campaign ended, the Corps commanded most of the armoured reserves preparing to face the proposed German invasion of Britain (Operation Sea Lion), while the other corps headquarters which had been evacuated from Dunkirk in Operation Dynamo were reorganised. Under Nosworthy's command IV Corps was envisaged as a counter-attack force. He continued as Commander of IX Corps in Tunisia from 1942 and as Commander-in-Chief of West Africa Command from 1943. He retired in February 1945.

References

Bibliography

External links
Generals of World War II

|-
 

|-
 

1887 births
1971 deaths
Jamaican military personnel
British military personnel of the Third Anglo-Afghan War
British Army lieutenant generals
Graduates of the Royal College of Defence Studies
British Army generals of World War II
British Army personnel of World War I
Companions of the Distinguished Service Order
Graduates of the Royal Military Academy, Woolwich
Graduates of the Staff College, Quetta
Knights Commander of the Order of the Bath
People educated at Exeter School
Recipients of the Military Cross
Royal Engineers officers